Polevoy is a rural locality (a settlement) and the administrative center of Polevoye Rural Settlement, Novoanninsky District, Volgograd Oblast, Russia. The population was 355 as of 2010. There are 12 streets.

Geography 
Polevoy is located on the Khopyorsko-Buzulukskaya Plain, 24 km north of Novoanninsky (the district's administrative centre) by road. Zvezdka is the nearest rural locality.

References 

Rural localities in Novoanninsky District